The pharyngeal veins begin in the pharyngeal plexus on the outer surface of the pharynx, and, after receiving some posterior meningeal veins and the vein of the pterygoid canal, end in the internal jugular.

They occasionally open into the facial, lingual, or superior thyroid vein.

References

External links

Veins of the head and neck